Below is a list of the Sydney Roosters coaches since 1908.

List of Coaches

See also

List of current NRL coaches
List of current NRL Women's coaches

References

External links

Coaches
 
National Rugby League lists
Lists of rugby league coaches
Sydney-sport-related lists